The Chicago Tribune Silver Football is awarded by the Chicago Tribune to the college football player determined to be the best player from the Big Ten Conference. The award has been presented annually since 1924, when Red Grange of Illinois was the award's first recipient.

A vote of Big Ten head football coaches determines the winner of the Silver Football. Each coach submits a two-player ballot with a first and second choice, and coaches cannot vote for players on their own team. The first-place vote receives two points and the second-place vote receives one point.

Coaches and media of the Big Ten also make annual selections for additional individual honors.

Recipients
The Silver Football award has been presented annually since 1924.

Winners by school

Winners by position

See also
 Chicago Tribune Silver Basketball

References

Big Ten Z
Big Ten Conference football
Silver
Most valuable player awards
Awards by newspapers
Awards established in 1924
1924 establishments in Illinois